The 2013 Knoxville NightHawks season was the first season for the professional indoor football franchise and their first in the Professional Indoor Football League (PIFL). The NightHawks were one of six teams that competed in the PIFL for the 2013 season.

The team played their home games under head coach Chris MacKeown at the James White Civic Coliseum in Knoxville, Tennessee. The NightHawks earned a 1–11 record, placing seventh in the league, failing to qualify for the playoffs.

The franchise was announced by Owner Jeff Knight on September 15, 2011. He announced the team's decision to join the Professional Indoor Football League and that the team would play at the James White Civic Coliseum. On October 4, 2011, the NightHawks named Chris MacKeown the team's first coach in franchise history. The team made a splash when they signed veteran NFL defensive lineman Chris Bradwell, and veteran Arena Football League quarterback, Tony Colston. In the team's first ever game, the NightHawks fell 45–70 to the Alabama Hammers. The team started 0–6 on the season before winning their 7th contest on May 5, 2012, an overtime victory over the Hammers. The team finished their inaugural season 1–11 with a 0.083 winning percentage, which was worst in the PIFL. Coach MacKeown said he felt that he would not be back for a second season with the team.

Schedule
Key:

Regular season
All start times are local to home team

Roster

Division standings

References

External links
2012 results

Knoxville NightHawks
Knoxville NightHawks
Knoxville NightHawks